"You Are Not Alone" is a song by the American singer Michael Jackson from his ninth studio album, HIStory: Past, Present and Future, Book I (1995). It was released on August 15, 1995, as the second single from the album.

An R&B ballad, "You Are Not Alone" was written by American singer R. Kelly for Jackson in response to difficult times in his own personal life. Kelly sent a demo tape to Jackson, who liked the song and decided to produce it with him in his Chicago studio. Jackson's interest in the song was also linked to events in his personal life. The music video, which featured Jackson and his then-wife Lisa Marie Presley, featured scenes of semi-nudity.

"You Are Not Alone" received generally positive reviews and was the recipient of Grammy and American Music Award nominations. It holds a Guinness World Record as the first song to debut at number one on the Billboard Hot 100, and was certified platinum by the RIAA. It also topped the charts in Austria, Belgium, France, Ireland, New Zealand, Poland, Romania, Scotland, Spain, Sweden, Switzerland, and the United Kingdom. It was re-released in 2006 as part of Jackson's box set Visionary: The Video Singles, and re-entered at number 30 in the UK Singles Chart.

"You Are Not Alone" was Jackson's thirteenth and final number-one US single during his lifetime. After his death in June 2009, Kelly paid tribute by including a version of the song performed by himself on his album Love Letter (2010). In 2011, a clip of the song was remixed with the Jackson song "I Just Can't Stop Loving You"; the final "Immortal Version" was released on the Immortal album.

Production and composition
"You Are Not Alone" is a pop and R&B ballad about love and isolation. The song was written by R. Kelly and produced by Kelly and Jackson. Kelly wrote the song after losing close people in his life. Kelly was delighted to be able to work with his idol, explaining "I was psyched ... I feel I could have done his whole album. Not being selfish. I was just that geeked about it. It was an experience out of this world ... It's amazing to know that five years ago I was writing songs in a basement in the ghetto and now I'm writing for Michael Jackson ... I'd be a fool not to say it's a dream come true." Jackson contacted Kelly to see if he had any material available. Kelly forwarded a tape recording of the song and Jackson then agreed to work with Kelly on the piece. On the tape sent to Jackson, Kelly sung "You Are Not Alone" mimicking Jackson's vocal style, explaining, "I think I am him. I become him. I want him to feel that as well." Jackson found the interpretation amusing. They spent the last week of November 1994 together in the studio working on the track.

Jackson explained that he instantly liked the song, but listened to it twice before making his final decision. Although the song was written by Kelly, Jackson was adamant that the production should be a collaborative effort among the two musicians. The tape sent to him had no harmony or modulations, so Jackson added a choir in the final portion and added a sense of climax and structure to the final piece. The song is written in the key of B major with the key later in the song changing to D♭ major then E♭ major. The song has a tempo of 60 beats per minute, making it one of Jackson's slowest songs.

Plagiarism
In 1993, Edward and Daniel van Passel wrote the score to a song titled "If We Can Start All Over". It was registered with the Belgian Society of Authors, Composers and Publishers (SABAM) that year. The score has never been commercially released, and can only be found as sheet music, which does not contain information about the timbre, rhythm or harmony.

When "You Are Not Alone" became a worldwide success, the van Passel brothers approached SABAM saying it was similar to their song. The internal committee noted similarities between the melodies and recommended pursuing a lawsuit against Kelly and Zomba Record Holding Holland BV. The brothers applied to the Court of Leuven for an injunction on October 18, 1995. The Belgian Court rejected the claim of plagiarism on January 20, 2003, finding that the 43.46% similarity between the two melodies was a coincidence. The van Passel brothers submitted an appeal.

On September 4, 2007, the Court of Appeal in Brussels reversed the 2003 ruling, based on the fact that Kelly's earliest evidence of writing "You Are Not Alone" was August 1995, 21 months after the brothers had registered their score for "If We Can Start All Over". The court concluded that it was possible that Kelly had accessed the score and developed this into "You Are Not Alone". Kelly maintains that he never met or heard of the van Passel brothers. The court also stated that the van Passel brothers "did not create their work merely in order to register it with SABAM and put it in a drawer, but at least informed third parties of the existence of their composition".

Belgium maintains a ban on all radio and television broadcasts of the "You Are Not Alone" song and music video. Vendors found with copies face fines of €1000 for each copy of the song. The van Passel brothers have gained recognition as co-writers of the melody for "You Are Not Alone" in Belgium.

Critical reaction
'You Are Not Alone' received positive views from music critics. In more recent years, Stephen Thomas Erlewine of AllMusic expressed the opinion that it was amongst some of the best songs Jackson ever released, calling the song seductive. Steve Baltin from Cash Box described it as a "weepy ballad". In his weekly UK chart commentary in Dotmusic, James Masterton said that it "probably ranks as one of the most beautiful songs Michael Jackson has ever recorded". Pan-European magazine Music & Media wrote, "A far cry from "Scream", Jackson undergoes a gigantic moodswing here. Sad as he is, the vibrato in his vocals perfectly complements the moody ballad". A reviewer from Music Week rated it five out of five, adding, "Barely a yelp or gulp to be had on this dead simple R Kelly-penned and produced ballad. Not the strongest slowie on the album but a lot of wayward fans will be hankering after some no-frills old style Jackson. A biggie." The R&B critic and journalist Nelson George described the song as lovely and supple. Jon Pareles of The New York Times felt it was the only conventional love song on the new material on HIStory. He compared it to Mariah Carey's song "Hero" and said it "sounds like a surefire hit". James Hunter of Rolling Stone noted that, "the excellent current single 'Scream' or the first-rate R&B ballad 'You Are Not Alone' – manage to link the incidents of Jackson's recent past to universal concepts, like injustice or isolation. When he bases his music in the bluntness of hip-hop, Jackson sketches funky scenarios denouncing greed, blanket unreliability and false accusation".

Writer and journalist J. Randy Taraborrelli wrote of the song in 2004, "[it] remains among Michael's best songs ... On listening to 'You Are Not Alone', one wonders how many times Michael tried to tell himself, during his most desperate and anguished times, that he did have support in his life, from a higher power, or even friends and family, whether he actually believed it or not". Fred Shuster of the Daily News of Los Angeles described it as the best song on the album. Conversely, while Steve Holsey of Michigan Chronicle gave the album a positive review, he described the song as the worst on the album, calling the Kelly penned lyrics "trite" and below the standard set by Jackson's own lyrical skills. Robert Christgau of Blender would later call it "quietly yucky" while pop music critic Bill Wyman of New York called it "drony and unpleasant." Revisiting "You Are Not Alone" in 2022, Tom Breihan of Stereogum negatively described the song as "thin gruel" and as a "sort of generic sad ballad", while complimenting Jackson's vocals for sounding "as tender and reassuring as ever". "You Are Not Alone" received an American Music Award nomination and a Grammy nomination both for "Best Pop Vocal Performance".

Chart performance
Commercially, "You Are Not Alone" remains one of Jackson's best selling singles and it is also his 13th and final number one song. It holds the Guinness World Record for the first song ever to debut at number one on the Billboard Hot 100 chart. It was also Jackson's last number one single on the chart. It debuted at number one with first week sales of 120,000 copies. The song was certified platinum by the RIAA and sold one million copies domestically. It broke the record set by his previous double A-side single "Scream" and "Childhood," which was the first song in the 37-year history of Billboard to debut at number five—where it peaked. It peaked at number one in the UK after a debut at number three in the prior week. The song also reached number one in Wallonia, France, New Zealand, Spain and Switzerland. In Canada it peaked at number two. It became a top ten hit in every major market.

Music video

The accompanying music video for "You Are Not Alone" was directed by Wayne Isham on July 12, 1995, and begins with a large number of paparazzi taking photographs of Jackson. The plot then centers around two locations: a temple where Jackson appears in an affectionate semi-nude scene with his then-wife, Lisa Marie Presley, and a theater where Jackson performs the song to an empty hall. Jackson also appears alone in other locations such as deserts and along tide pools. The slightly extended version that appeared on HIStory on Film, Volume II was notable for scenes where special effects were used to give Jackson white, feathery, almost angelic wings. Several of these scenes included Jackson's side having been pierced by an arrow. The other version of the video is included on Number Ones and Michael Jackson's Vision. The temple scenes were a homage to Maxfield Parrish's 1922 painting Daybreak. The theater scenes were filmed at the Pantages Theatre, in Los Angeles.

Live performances
Jackson first performed "You Are Not Alone" at the 1995 Soul Train Music Awards, and also at the 1995 MTV Video Music Awards. At the latter awards ceremony, the song was performed without the second verse. Jackson then performed the song at the Royal Brunei concert in 1996 where it was performed as a complete song. Jackson also performed it during the HIStory World Tour as a complete song, during which one girl was allowed to dance with him on stage, similar to the Soul Train Music Awards performance. Jackson's next performance of "You Are Not Alone" was at the MJ & Friends concert in Seoul on June 25, 1999; this also turned out to be the song's last performance by Jackson himself, occurring ten years to the day of his death. The song was performed without the second verse, similar to the "1995 MTV Awards" performancanceledong was also due to be performed at the This Is It concert series, however, the shows were cancelled due to his death.

Diana Ross recorded a version of this song on her international-only released album, Voice of Love produced by Nick Martinelli. Ross would also close her successful 2010–12 More Today Than Yesterday: The Greatest Hits Tour with this song as a tribute to Jackson.

Track listings
 CD single
 "You Are Not Alone" – 4:54
 "Scream Louder (Flyte Tyme Remix)" – 5:30

 12-inch single
 "You Are Not Alone (R. Kelly Remix)" – 6:25
 "You Are Not Alone (Jon B. Main Remix)" – 6:55
 "You Are Not Alone (Franctified Club Mix)" – 10:09
 "Rock With You (Frankie's Favorite Club Mix)" – 7:45
 "Rock With You (Masters At Work Remix)" – 5:30

Personnel
 Produced by R. Kelly and Michael Jackson
 Recorded and mixed by Bruce Swedien
 Michael Jackson – lead and background vocals, vocal and rhythm arrangements
 R. Kelly and Steve Porcaro – synthesizers and keyboards
 Peter Mokran, Andrew Scheps, and Steve Porcaro – synthesizer programming

Charts

Weekly charts

Year-end charts

Certifications and sales

The X Factor UK 2009 finalists version

The top twelve acts from the sixth series of TV talent show The X Factor in the United Kingdom released a cover version of the song on November 15, 2009, in aid of Great Ormond Street Hospital. The finalists premiered the song live on the November 15 edition of the programme; the single was available for digital download that day and a physical release followed the day after. The release of the song follows a similar occurrence a year earlier, when the final twelve acts from the fifth series released a cover version of Mariah Carey's "Hero" in aid of Help for Heroes and raised over £1 million. It has been confirmed to have sold over 400,000 copies, therefore achieving a Gold single certification.

Music video
The video is very similar to the video of the cover version of the charity single of the year before. It shows various contestants performing their part in front of a plain black background, then shows the 12 finalists together performing the song in front of a screen of photos. Photos and video footage of the finalists at the Great Ormond Street Hospital are shown throughout the video.

Charts

Year-end charts

R. Kelly version

R. Kelly recorded his own version of the song and put it on his 2010 album Love Letter, he recorded it as a tribute to Jackson following his death. The song was a hidden bonus song on the album, shown as the final song on the album's track list. The song starts with Kelly paying tribute to Jackson, saying "In loving memories of my hero... MJ".

Track listing
Digital single from Love Letter

References

Bibliography

George, Nelson (2004). Michael Jackson: The Ultimate Collection. Sony BMG.

1990s ballads
1995 songs
1995 singles
2009 singles
Michael Jackson songs
Diana Ross songs
Billboard Hot 100 number-one singles
European Hot 100 Singles number-one singles
SNEP Top Singles number-one singles
Irish Singles Chart number-one singles
Music videos directed by Wayne Isham
Number-one singles in New Zealand
Number-one singles in Scotland
Number-one singles in Spain
Number-one singles in Switzerland
UK Singles Chart number-one singles
Ultratop 50 Singles (Wallonia) number-one singles
Contemporary R&B ballads
Pop ballads
Songs written by R. Kelly
Song recordings produced by R. Kelly
Great Ormond Street Hospital
Song recordings produced by Michael Jackson
Songs involved in plagiarism controversies
Epic Records singles
Syco Music singles
MJJ Music singles
Sony Music singles